The De Turk Round Barn in Santa Rosa, California, United States, was a round barn that was built in 1891 by Santa Rosa Winery owner De Turk.  It was used for his champion trotter horses until his death in 1896.  It was listed on the National Register of Historic Places in 2004. 

It was significant as one of very few round or polygonal barns surviving in Northern California.

References

Barns on the National Register of Historic Places in California
Buildings and structures in Santa Rosa, California
Infrastructure completed in 1891
Round barns in California
National Register of Historic Places in Sonoma County, California